Chellis is a surname. Notable people with this surname include:

 Con Chellis (born 1978), American politician
 Darryl Chellis (born 1936), Australian politician
 John Chellis Conner (1913–2001), American marimbist
 John F. Chellis (1792–1883), American politician

See also
 Chellis Glendinning, American author and social-change activist